Johan Henrik Nordström (April 30, 1891 – February 10, 1982) was a Swedish track and field athlete who competed in the 1912 Summer Olympics. In 1912 he was qualified for the final of the 5000 metres event but did not participate in the race. He also started in the individual cross country competition but did not finish the race.

References

External links
profile

1891 births
1982 deaths
Swedish male long-distance runners
Olympic athletes of Sweden
Athletes (track and field) at the 1912 Summer Olympics
Olympic cross country runners